Christmas Peace is a tradition based on old Swedish legislation created by Birger Jarl in the 13th century, extending the tradition of the Truce of God. Offenders who committed crimes on religious holidays like Christmas were given harsher punishments. Today it is a tradition to recommend that people behave in a respectful and peaceful manner at Christmas. The Declaration of Christmas Peace has remained in Finland where it is an essential part of the Christmas tradition.

Declaration of Christmas Peace in Finland 

Today, the tradition of Christmas Peace survives mainly in Finland, which was an integral part of Sweden from the late 13th Century until 1809. Declaration of Christmas Peace is announced in several Finnish cities on Christmas Eve.

The oldest and most popular event is held at noon at the Old Great Square of the former Finnish capital Turku where the declaration has been read since the 1320s. The most significant exceptions to this are thought to be the years of the Greater Wrath when Finland was under Russian occupation which lasted from 1712 to 1721, and the single years missed during both the 1917 militia strike and the Winter War year of 1939. There may also have been a break between 1800 and 1815. In 2020 and 2021, the Christmas Peace was declared without an audience due to the COVID-19 pandemic.

The Turku declaration has been broadcast by the Finnish Broadcasting Company since 1935. National television broadcasts started in 1983 and the Turku declaration has also been seen on the Swedish television since 1986. The event can be viewed via the internet as well. Besides Turku, the declaration is also announced in some of the oldest Finnish towns like Rauma, Porvoo, Pori and the Estonian city of Tartu.

Music has been a part of the event since the 17th century. Traditional instruments used include the bagpipes, timpanis and various string instruments. The current format was established in 1903. It starts with the hymn "A Mighty Fortress Is Our God" and is followed by the declaration which is announced by a city official at midday. As the declaration is read in Finnish and Swedish, the public sings the Finnish national anthem in both languages afterward. The event ends with March of the Men of Pori which is usually played by a local military band, usually from the Finnish Navy.

The text 
The present version of the Turku declaration was written down in 1827. The text used differs in other.

English translation of the Turku Declaration of Christmas Peace:
"Tomorrow, God willing, is the graceful celebration of the birth of our Lord and Saviour;

and thus is declared a peaceful Christmas time to all, by advising devotion and to behave otherwise quietly and peacefully,

because he who breaks this peace and violates the peace of Christmas by any illegal or improper behaviour shall under aggravating circumstances be guilty
and punished according to what the law and statutes prescribe for each and every offence separately.

Finally, a joyous Christmas feast is wished to all inhabitants of the city."

Gallery

See also 
 Christmas truce of World War I

References

External links 
 2012 Declaration of Christmas Peace in Turku

Peace
Peace
Finnish culture